Assil Diab (اصيل دياب) is a Sudanese visual artist, graphic designer and graffiti artist, based in United States. She was born in Romania and moved with her parents to Qatar as a child. 

Assil graduated from Virginia Commonwealth University (VCU) in 2011 in Richmond, Virginia – USA with a Bachelor of Fine Arts Degree in Graphics Design.

In 2021 she received the 10 Under 10 Award  and was recognized as being one of VCU’s top 10 graduates of the last decade for her noteworthy achievements in her career and the community.

Since her graduation she has worked as a freelance graphic designer and graffiti artist, designing logos and branding for companies as well as commissioned to paint the walls of restaurants, cafes, shops and businesses.

In 2020 she won a dissemination award from UNESCO and i4policy for a self-initiated street art campaign she did on the coronavirus in Sudan. She has also been a honorary cultural Ambassador to Qatar Museums since 2018 till present day. In addition to spray painting on the walls of Sudan and Qatar, Assil's artwork has also been exhibited in Bahrain, Germany, Bangladesh, and the USA. Her work has also been published in books, including Artisans of the Middle East and “Dreesha”.

In 2019, she returned to Khartoum and became known for her graffiti murals honouring Sudanese citizens, who were killed during the Sudanese Revolution.

Early years and education 
During her early childhood, her family moved to Qatar. She attended the Virginia Commonwealth University in Qatar and in Richmond, Virginia, USA, and graduated in 2011 with a Bachelor of Fine Arts in graphic design. She also holds a diploma in Digital Marketing and Advanced Social Media Marketing.

Artistic career 
Diab works as a freelance graphic designer and graffiti artist. She has been called the first female graffiti artist in Qatar and in Sudan. Before she moved into freelancing as a graffiti artist, she worked at Doha Film Institute (DFI) and for Al Jazeera Children's Channel.

In 2019, she went back to Sudan, where she undertook an artistic project to honour Sudan's protesting citizens, who lost their lives during the Sudanese revolution. For this project, she created murals of the victims on walls of their respective family homes.

Exhibitions 
 LAS Charity Fashion Show with pop art exhibition by Assil Diab - Grand Regal Hotel (2013)
 Virginia Commonwealth University in Qatar
Iwalewahaus Gallery in Bayreuth, Germany (2017)
 Red Bull's Artspace in Bahrain, called ‘Malja’ (2015 and 2016)
 Karmakol Festival in Sudan (2017)

See also 

 Visual arts of Sudan

References

Further reading

External links 
 Assil Diab - graphic artist (YouTube video in Arabic, with English subtitles)
 "Meet The People Of Qatar" episode 09 - Assil Diab (YouTube video in English)
How Art Helped Propel Sudan’s Revolution magazine article about artists active in the Sudanese Revolution

Living people
Sudanese artists
Virginia Commonwealth University alumni
Year of birth missing (living people)
21st-century women artists
Women graffiti artists
Sudanese graphic designers
Sudanese contemporary artists
Women muralists